Thomas Peszek (born January 4, 1985) is an American rower. He participated in the 2012 Summer Olympics in London where he competed in the Men's Pair event together with his teammate Silas Stafford. They finished second in the B finals, earning them an eighth place overall.

References

1985 births
Living people
Rowers at the 2012 Summer Olympics
American male rowers
Olympic rowers of the United States
World Rowing Championships medalists for the United States